Lola Djangi Chécain, (18 August 1942 - 10 August 1992)  was a soukous recording artist, composer, and vocalist in the Democratic Republic of the Congo. He was once a member of the soukous band TPOK Jazz, led by François Luambo Makiadi, which dominated the Congolese music scene from the 1950s to the 1980s.

Partial discography
 Emilie Na Gabon
 Lunda Maguy
 Gaby Ozali Coupable (1970)
 Nganda Ma Campagne (1973)
 Lukika (1974)
 Toboyana Kaka (1975)
 Baninga Tokola Balingaka Ngai Te (1975)
 Meka Okangama (1980) 
 Libala ya Bana Na Bana
 Lolaka (1981)
 Mpo Na Nini Kaka Ngai? (1987)
 Sala Lokola Luntadila (1977)

See also
 Franco Luambo Makiadi
 Sam Mangwana
 Josky Kiambukuta
 Simaro Lutumba
 Ndombe Opetum
 Youlou Mabiala
 Mose Fan Fan
 Wuta Mayi
 TPOK Jazz
 List of African musicians

References

https://books.google.co.ke/books?id=gKEHO1z413EC&pg=PA382&lpg=PA382&dq=lola+checain&source=bl&ots=-ytlddNIrg&sig=ACfU3U0LlPluRbo8tI3N4kWLeRpCFyp8Jw&hl=en&sa=X&ved=2ahUKEwj0vfKD8-TvAhVBZhQKHTX_DxE4FBDoATAHegQIBhAC#v=onepage&q=lola%20checain&f=true

External links
 Overview of Composition of TPOK Jazz

20th-century Democratic Republic of the Congo male singers
Soukous musicians
TPOK Jazz members
1942 births
1992 deaths